Eduard Aleksandrovich Basurin (Ukrainian: Едуард Олександрович Басурін; born 27 June 1966) is the Deputy Defense Minister and Defense Spokesman of the Donetsk People's Republic (DPR) militia command, which the Ukrainian government has designed a terrorist organization.

Early life 
Prior to the Russo-Ukrainian War which began in 2014, he worked for a company that produced paint.

Political career 
In 2014 he served as a political commissar of the Kalmius Battalion, a paramilitary group operating under the Donetsk People's Republic organization. From 2014 onwards, he has worked as press secretary, def facto spokesman for the self-proclaimed Donetsk People's Republic.

Basurin has been accused of repeatedly attempting to obstruct the OSCE mission in Donbas. In 2015 he was sanctioned by the European Union On January 9, 2016, Basurin was sanctioned under the Ukraine  Designations Regarding Separatists (E.O. 13660) sanctions program by the United States "For being responsible for or complicit in, or having engaged in, directly or indirectly, actions or policies that threaten the peace security, stability, sovereignty, or territorial integrity of Ukraine"; "Asserting governmental authority over a part or region of Ukraine without the authorization of the Government of Ukraine; and acting for or on behalf of the previously designated, self-proclaimed Donetsk People’s Republic (DPR) or the previously designated, self-proclaimed Luhansk People’s Republic (LPR)"

During the 2022 Russian invasion of Ukraine, Basurin called for using chemical weapons against the defenders of Mariupol. On 16 April, Ukraine's military intelligence reported that Basurin had been detained by Russia in connection to revealing chemical weapons use. However, these allegations were not substantiated, and Basurin continued in his duties, prodding Ukrainian troops in SIeverodonetsk to surrender on June 13 in an official capacity as DPR military spokesman.

See also 

Arsen Pavlov
Mikhail Tolstykh
Alexander Zakharchenko
List of unsolved murders
Separatist forces of the war in Donbas

References

External links

Pro-Russian people of the 2014 pro-Russian unrest in Ukraine
People of the Donetsk People's Republic
Living people
1966 births
Politicians from Donetsk
Pro-Russian people of the war in Donbas
Russian individuals subject to European Union sanctions
Sanctioned due to Russo-Ukrainian War
Ukrainian collaborators with Russia